Chawanni is a small town located in the Beldandi municipality that supplies the most goods for the local people. These goods are mainly traded from nearby Indian towns and Bhimdatta (formerly called Mahendranagar).

Populated places in Kanchanpur District